Paul McNamee and Martina Navratilova were the defending champions, but decided not to play together. McNamee competed with Hana Mandlíková but lost in the first round to David Graham and Elise Burgin, while Navratilova played with Heinz Günthardt.

Ken Flach and Kathy Jordan defeated Günthardt and Navratilova in the final by 6–3, 7–6(9–7) to win the mixed doubles tennis title at the 1986 Wimbledon Championships.

Seeds

  Ken Flach /  Kathy Jordan (champions)
  John Fitzgerald /  Elizabeth Smylie (quarterfinals)
  Heinz Günthardt /  Martina Navratilova (final)
  Paul McNamee /  Hana Mandlíková (first round)
  Scott Davis /  Betsy Nagelsen (withdrew)
  Christo van Rensburg /  Rosalyn Fairbank (third round)
  Pavel Složil /  Claudia Kohde-Kilsch (second round)
  John Lloyd /  Wendy Turnbull (quarterfinals)
  Emilio Sánchez /  Bettina Bunge (semifinals)
  Mark Edmondson /  Anne Hobbs (third round)
  Sergio Casal /  Raffaella Reggi (third round)
  Gary Donnelly /  Paula Smith (second round)
  Kim Warwick /  Jenny Byrne  (first round)
  Steve Denton /  Eva Pfaff (third round)
  Jakob Hlasek /  Christiane Jolissaint (second round)
  Jeremy Bates /  Jo Durie / (quarterfinals)

Draw

Finals

Top half

Section 1

Section 2

Bottom half

Section 3

Section 4

References

External links

1986 Wimbledon Championships – Doubles draws and results at the International Tennis Federation

X=Mixed Doubles
Wimbledon Championship by year – Mixed doubles